The 11th Ryder Cup Matches were held November 5–6, 1955, at Thunderbird Country Club in Rancho Mirage, California. The United States team won its seventh consecutive competition by a score of 8 to 4 points.

Format
The Ryder Cup is a match play event, with each match worth one point.  From 1927 through 1959, the format consisted of 4 foursome (alternate shot) matches on the first day and 8 singles matches on the second day, for a total of 12 points.  Therefore, 6 points were required to win the Cup.  All matches were played to a maximum of 36 holes.

Teams
Source: 

Seven members of the British team were chosen from the Order of Merit after the 1955 Open Championship. To qualify players had to play in 5 of the 6 qualifying events. The qualifying events were all stroke-play tournaments played in Great Britain from the Spalding Tournament ending on 22 April to the Open Championship ending on 8 July. The last three places were chosen by the seven players already selected and the four members of the PGA tournament sub-committee. The seven who qualified after the Open were: Rees, Bradshaw, Scott, Weetman, O'Connor, Bousfield and Jacobs. Later in July, Rees was chosen as captain. The three remaining players, Brown, Lees and Fallon, were chosen at the end of the Dunlop Masters in September. Brown had recently lost in the final of the News of the World Match Play where Lees was a losing semi-finalist. Fallon was runner-up in the Open Championship.

Saturday's foursome matches

18 hole scores: Harper/Barber: 2 up, Ford/Kroll: 3 up, Lees/Weetman: 1 up, Bradshaw/Rees v Snead/Middlecoff: all square.

Sunday's singles matches

18 hole scores: Bolt: 3 up, Harbert: 6 up, Middlecoff: 2 up, Snead: 5 up, Lees v Furgol: all square, Brown: 3 up, Bradshaw v Burke: all square, Ford: 1 up.

Individual player records
Each entry refers to the win–loss–half record of the player.

Source:

United States

Great Britain

Ken Bousfield did not play in any matches.

References

External links
PGA of America: 1955 Ryder Cup
About.com: 1955 Ryder Cup
Thunderbird Country Club – official site

Ryder Cup
Golf in California
Ryder Cup
Ryder Cup
Ryder Cup
Ryder Cup